Ilkka Untamo Järvi-Laturi (28 November 1961 – 5 March 2023) was Finnish-born US-based film director whose best known film was Spy Games (1999) starring Bill Pullman and Irene Jacob. The film was shot in Helsinki, New York and Toronto.  Järvi-Laturi had a cameo role in the film.

Before making the film Spy Games, Järvi-Laturi directed and served as co-director of several films in Finland. He has also acted in the 1985 film The Unknown Soldier.
 
Järvi-Laturi won the Nordic Film Prize for the best Scandinavian Film of The Year and the highest Finnish film prize Jussi Award (best screenplay) in 1990 for Kotia Päin (Homebound). His Estonian actioner Darkness in Tallinn is the most widely distributed Estonian film so far, and won the Silver Alexander in Thessaloniki and the Fassbinder prize in Mannheim.

Järvi-Laturi lived in New York City and Beijing. He died in Padasjoki on 5 March 2023, at the age of 61.

Filmography

Directed
1999: History Is Made at Night: 
1993: Darkness in Tallinn (City Unplugged)
1989: Kotia päin (Homebound)
1988: Kaasari (Short)
1986: Come with Us (Short)
1983: Arsenikkia ja wanhoja peniksiä (Short)

Written
2011: Ensisuukko
1993: Darkness in Tallinn (City Unplugged)
1989: Kotia päin
1988: Kaasari (Short)
1988: Nuoruuteni savotat
1983: Arsenikkia ja wanhoja peniksiä

Acted

1999: History Is Made at Night:  ... Man outside the jazz-bar (uncredited)
1989: Talvisota ...  Private by the River Bank
1988: Nuoruuteni savotat ... Hoikkalan Kalle
1985: The Unknown Soldier: ... Young Second Lieutenant
1984: Angelan sota ...  dying patient 
1982: Tyly rakkaus (TV Movie) ... Juha

Produced
1993: Darkness in Tallinn (executive producer)
1988: Kaasari (Short) (producer)
1986: Come with Us (Short) (producer)
1983: Arsenikkia ja wanhoja peniksiä (Short) (producer)

References

1961 births
2023 deaths
Finnish emigrants to the United States
Finnish film directors
Finnish screenwriters
Film directors from New York City